The Same Love is the seventh studio album by the Christian Contemporary Christian music-worship musician Paul Baloche. The album, produced by Ben Gowell and Michael Rossback, was released on March 13, 2012, by Integrity Media. It reached No. 30 on the Billboard Top Christian Albums chart and gained critical acclaim.

Music and lyrics
Barry Westman of All About Worship wrote that the album contains "a batch of fresh, powerful, creative new songs for the church". Allmusics Robert Ham wrote that the "songs build and build until they overflow with choruses that sound amazing when sung by a huge group of people", and stated that "Loud or soft, Baloche knows how to pull at the spirit, calling for listeners to lift up their voices and join in". At CCM Magazine, Andrew Greer wrote that the music comes from "a modern worship waymaker, Baloche's twelfth recording offers his most distinctive songs and relevant production to date [...] a heady statement considering his two decade catalog of church staples like 'Your Name' and 'Hosana.'" He felt that with "modern electric and acoustic trends, his engaging vocal, plus co-writes and guest vocals by Kari Jobe and All Sons & Daughters add hip factor".

At Cross Rhythms, Doug Holland said that Baloche tends to get "into the song very quickly, with straightforward and grand lyrical ideas helping to build swiftly to a big guitar-driven chorus". Jonathan Andre of Indie Vision Music highlighted that "The Same Love shows a maturity in Paul's writing, as he combines simple melodies and honest lyrics with ingenious instrumental arrangements". At New Release Tuesday, Dawn Teresa wrote that Baloche is "the sensitive singer-songwriter with heartfelt songs ... and this CD is sure to capture listeners' hearts and radio programmers' ears". Jono Davies of Louder Than the Music wrote that "there is a great mix of styles and tempos here which is interesting to listen to musically and again Paul does what he does best, singing lyrics that tell the listener how great God is".

Christian Music Zines Joshua Andre wrote that "this album can literally be sung in the church. With more collaborations, co-writes and guest vocals on this album than any other he has done, for me Paul has raised the bar higher than ever on 'The Same Love', which I am sure has the potential to be a classic worship album in 10 or so years". However, The Citizens Bruce Dennill thought that "given the congregational context he's writing for, such a start all but guarantees a good reception, but it's not necessarily interesting from a listening point of view". With respect to vocals, Dave Urbanski of Christianity Today wrote, "Baloche's moody vocals are reminiscent of Switchfoot's Jon Foreman, which blends well with the album's modern-rock vibe." Davies of Louder Than the Music wrote that "there is a fresh hint of youthfulness in his voice, how he has done this I don't know, but all I can say is his voice sounds in top tune for this album" with his "vocals sounding as fresh and strong".

Critical reception

The Same Love was acclaimed by music critics. All About Worships Barry Westman called it an "amazing album". Robert Ham of Allmusic felt that Baloche "doesn't need to tweak the formula one iota". At CCM Magazine, Andrew Greer said that "the lyrical heart of Love is timeless, providing career trends are second to truth telling for Baloche, one of the industry's true worship pioneers". Joshua Andre of Christian Music Zine proclaimed the album to be a "truly [...] magnificent masterpiece". He felt that it is "a work of art, nothing short of amazing".

At Christianity Today, Dave Urbanski highlighted the "pitch-perfect production, a heavenward focus — The Same Love delivers the goods". The Citizens Bruce Dennill wrote that "a firm musical foundation is essential when writing lyrics that overlap thematically, and The Same Love combines everything well". At Cross Rhythms, Doug Holland felt that "whether it will be embraced by the Church to quite the same extent remains to be seen". Jonathan Andre of Indie Vision Music wrote, "Well done Paul for this worship experience!"

Louder Than the Musics Jono Davies affirmed that he "would highly recommend this album to anybody", and that the release contains "many more gems as good as that title track". At New Release Tuesday, Dawn Teresa called it a "steadfast, earnest offering in which he, like his biblical namesake, points us again and again to the Gospel, the good news that is Jesus Christ", and noted that "from beginning to end, the album's gaze never shifts". She wrote that "for worship music that is genuine and leaves plenty of quiet for prayer and reflection, and for God to move, look no further than Paul Baloche" for "a top-notch worship album".

Commercial performance
The album was at No. 30  in the Billboard Top Christian Albums chart in the United States for the week of March 31, 2012.

Track listing

Personnel 
 Paul Baloche – vocals, acoustic guitar, electric guitars
 John Arndt – keyboards, string arrangements 
 Jason Ingram – keyboards, backing vocals 
 Ben Gowell – keyboards, programming, acoustic guitar,  electric guitars, mandolin, dobro, banjo, lap steel guitar, percussion
 Michael Rossback – keyboards, programming, electric guitars, pedal steel guitar, bass guitar, percussion, glockenspiel, trumpet, backing vocals 
 Don Harris – acoustic piano, electric upright bass
 Jay Wadley – Hammond B3 organ
 Tyler Burkum – electric guitars, lap steel guitar 
 Scotty Murray – electric guitars, pedal steel guitar 
 Aaron Fabrinni – electric upright bass 
 Carl Albrecht – drums, percussion
 Daniel Grothe – drums 
 David Halvorson – cello 
 Dan Lawonn – cello
 Catherine Hanson – viola
 Rebecca Harris-Lee – violin 
 Rita Baloche – backing vocals, vocal arrangements 
 Lyssa Berner – backing vocals 
 Michael Bryce – backing vocals 
 Brothers McClurg (Anthony Hoisington and Chris Hoisington) – backing vocals 
 Kyle Bucklin – backing vocals 
 Laurie Cooper – backing vocals 
 Ben Fielding – backing vocals 
 Dianne Frias – backing vocals 
 Justin Gearing – backing vocals 
 Laura Gearing – backing vocals 
 Dave Hatley – backing vocals 
 Kari Jobe – backing vocals 
 Mary Jones – backing vocals 
 Leslie Jordan – backing vocals 
 Angela Krüsi – backing vocals 
 David Leonard – backing vocals 
 Dakota McGrath – backing vocals 
 Andrea Romero – backing vocals 
 Kathryn Scott – backing vocals

Production 
 C. Ryan Dunham – executive producer 
 Jay King – A&R
 Ben Gowell – producer, engineer, mixing 
 Michael Rossback – producer, engineer 
 Rita Baloche – vocal producer 
 Gary Leach – additional engineer 
 Roy Salmond – additional engineer 
 Rusty Varenkamp – additional engineer 
 Ainslie Grosser – mixing 
 Sean Moffitt – mixing 
 Shane D. Wilson – mixing 
 Dan Shike – mastering at Tone and Volume Mastering in Nashville, Tennessee
 Dave Taylor – production coordinator 
 Frank Dejong – production manager 
 Thom Hoyman – creative director, design 
 Jeremy Cowart – photography

Charts

References

2012 albums
Contemporary worship music albums
Paul Baloche albums